Aaron Gurd (born 18 September 2001), is an Australian professional footballer who plays as a center back for Sydney FC.

Career
Gurd was promoted through the Sydney FC academy ranks as a youngster, making his NPL debut in 2019. In 2022 he was signed along with Jaiden Kucharski to the A-League Men's team on a scholarship deal. Gurd made his debut for the club against the Central Coast Mariners in the 2022 Australia Cup round of 32, in which Sydney would go on to win on penalties. The next game against NPL Victoria  club Bentleigh Greens he started the game alongside veteran defender Alex Wilkinson and scored the second goal in their 2-0 victory.

References

External links

Living people
2004 births
Australian people of Tibetan descent
People of Tibetan descent
Australian soccer players
Association football midfielders
Sydney FC players
A-League Men players
National Premier Leagues players